Alexandros Doris (born 10 July 1998) is a Greek professional footballer who plays as a midfielder for Super League 2 club Iraklis.

Honours
Volos
Football League: 2018–19

References

1998 births
Living people
Greek footballers
Super League Greece players
Super League Greece 2 players
Football League (Greece) players
Veria F.C. players
Apollon Pontou FC players
Volos N.F.C. players
Episkopi F.C. players
Xanthi F.C. players
Iraklis Thessaloniki F.C. players
Association football midfielders
Footballers from Florina
21st-century Greek people